Kurt Epstein (January 29, 1904 – February 1, 1975) was a Czechoslovakian Olympic water polo player and survivor of Nazi concentration camps.

Early life
Epstein was Jewish, and born to Maximilian and Helena Epstein. He grew up in Roudnice nad Labem on the bank of the Elbe River, 22 miles north of Prague, in what was then the Austro-Hungarian province of Bohemia. He lived in a house built by his father in 1900, on the site on which his grandfather built the first ever house owned by a Jew outside the Jewish quarter of Prague in 1830. While in high school, he became a competitive rower and swimmer, and also a swimming coach.

In 1924, he joined the Czechoslovak Army, was picked for reserve officers school, and became a second lieutenant. The Czechoslovak National Swim Club asked that he be granted leave of absence to compete for them.

Water polo career
Epstein represented Czechoslovakia in water polo at the 1928 Summer Olympics and the 1936 Summer Olympics. His team finished tied in ninth position in both Olympics.

Incarceration in Nazi concentration camps
After the German occupation of Czechoslovakia in 1938, Epstein was incarcerated at various Nazi concentration camps, including Theresienstadt concentration camp, Auschwitz concentration camp, and a labour camp at Frýdlant. All of the other members of his family were killed as a result of being gassed by the Nazis.

Later life
He returned to Prague after World War II, and was elected a member of the Czechoslovak Olympic Committee. After the Communists took over in 1948, he emigrated to the United States.

He married Franci Rabinek Solar, a dress designer who had herself been interned at Theresienstadt concentration camp, then Auschwitz concentration camp, and finally Bergen-Belsen concentration camp from which the British had liberated her. She was also the only survivor in her family. They had a daughter, Helen Epstein, who became a writer and an associate professor of journalism at New York University, and two sons.

In New York City during 1948, the New York Athletic Club permitted Kurt to observe one of their water polo matches, but clarified that as they did not accept Jews as members, he would not be hired as a coach. After a decade of being unable to find steady employment, he ultimately became a cutter in a clothing factory of Star Children's Wear in the Garment District.

See also
List of select Jewish water polo players

References

External links
Sports Reference bio

1904 births
1975 deaths
Olympic water polo players of Czechoslovakia
Water polo players at the 1928 Summer Olympics
Water polo players at the 1936 Summer Olympics
Czechoslovak male water polo players
Czech male swimmers
People from Roudnice nad Labem
Auschwitz concentration camp survivors
Theresienstadt Ghetto survivors
Czechoslovak Jews
Jewish American sportspeople
Czechoslovak emigrants to the United States
Sportspeople from New York City
Czechoslovak soldiers
Czechoslovak male swimmers
Jewish swimmers
Jewish water polo players
20th-century American Jews